Taiping was a Chinese steamer that sank after a collision with another vessel while en route from mainland China to Taiwan on 27 January 1949.  With an estimated death toll of over 1,500 people, it ranks as one of the ten deadliest peacetime maritime disasters in history.

Final voyage
Taiping was packed to nearly twice her rated capacity, carrying over 1,000 refugees fleeing advancing Chinese Communist forces during the Chinese Civil War, when she departed Shanghai, China on 26 January 1949, bound for Keelung, Taiwan. Some estimates put the number of passengers on board at over 1,500, although the ship was only rated to carry 580 passengers.

After midnight on 27 January 1949, Taiping was steaming at night with her lights out, owing to a curfew, when she collided with the smaller cargo ship Chienyuan near the Zhoushan Archipelago. She sank, killing over 1,500 passengers and crew members.

Commemoration
Taiping, which made many journeys between mainland China and Taiwan before her tragic end, has been compared to the Mayflower for her role in bringing Chinese immigrants to Taiwan. A memorial to the ship and those who died aboard her was established at Keelung Harbor naval base on Taiwan.

In popular culture
The Crossing, a 2014 film directed by John Woo, is about the sinking of Taiping.

References

1949 in China
Maritime incidents in 1949
Ships sunk in collisions
Shipwrecks in the Pacific Ocean
1940s ships